The 2015 European Darts Trophy was the seventh of nine PDC European Tour events on the 2015 PDC Pro Tour. The tournament took place at the RWE-Sporthalle in Mülheim, Germany between 11–13 September 2015. It featured a field of 48 players and £115,000 in prize money, with £25,000 going to the winner.

Michael Smith won the title by defeating Michael van Gerwen 6–2 in the final.

Prize money
The prize fund was increased to £115,000 after being £100,000 for the previous two years.

Qualification and format
The top 16 players from the PDC ProTour Order of Merit on 30 June 2015 automatically qualified for the event. The remaining 32 places went to players from three qualifying events - 20 from the UK Qualifier (held in Wigan on 3 July), eight from the European Qualifier (held in Mülheim on 10 September) at the same time as the European Darts Matchplay and four from the Host Nation Qualifier (held at the venue the day before the event started).

The following players took part in the tournament:

Top 16
  Michael van Gerwen (runner-up)
  Michael Smith (winner)
  James Wade (quarter-finals)
  Adrian Lewis (third round)
  Peter Wright (semi-finals)
  Ian White (semi-finals)
  Brendan Dolan (second round)
  Dave Chisnall (quarter-finals)
  Justin Pipe (third round)
  Mervyn King (quarter-finals)
  Simon Whitlock (second round)
  Kim Huybrechts (third round)
  Terry Jenkins (quarter-finals)
  Robert Thornton (third round)
  Vincent van der Voort (second round)
  Benito van de Pas (second round)

UK Qualifier 
  Chris Dobey (first round)
  Stephen Bunting (second round)
  Gerwyn Price (first round)
  Steve West (second round)
  James Hubbard (first round)
  Adam Hunt (second round)
  Jamie Bain (first round)
  Mark Barilli (first round)
  Connie Finnan (first round)
  James Wilson (second round)
  Jason Lovett (third round)
  Mark Frost (first round)
  Andy Jenkins (second round)
  Kevin Painter (third round)
  Alan Norris (first round)
  Daryl Gurney (second round)
  Mark Dudbridge (first round)
  David Pallett (first round)
  Wes Newton (second round)
  Darren Johnson (second round)

European Qualifier
  Krzysztof Ratajski (first round)
  Rowby-John Rodriguez (third round)
  Dirk van Duijvenbode (first round)
  Cristo Reyes (third round)
  Mensur Suljović (second round)
  Raymond van Barneveld (first round)
  Jan Dekker (second round)
  Christian Kist (second round)

Host Nation Qualifier
  Jyhan Artut (first round)
  Max Hopp (second round)
  Christian Soethe (first round)
  Martin Schindler (first round)

Draw

References

2015 PDC European Tour
2015 in German sport